Operation Dames is a 1959 Korean War film directed by Louis Clyde Stoumen and starring Eve Meyer. American International Pictures released the film in the United States as a double feature with Tank Commandos. It was retitled Girls in Action for release in the Commonwealth of Nations countries, possibly to avoid a connection with the honorific title dame.

Plot
A band of USO entertainers is trapped behind enemy lines in Korea in 1950. They include singer Lorry Evering, who, after being attacked, attracts the interest of an army sergeant who attempts to guide the group of civilians to safety.

Cast

See also
 List of American films of 1959

References

External links

Operation Dames at TCMDB

1959 films
American war films
Korean War films
American International Pictures films
Films scored by Richard Markowitz
1950s English-language films
1950s American films